Original Tommy's, previously known as Original Tommy's World Famous Hamburgers, is a fast food hamburger restaurant chain in Southern California, United States.  It is known for its hamburgers and chili burgers.

History
The original location was opened on May 15, 1946, by Tom Koulax  (October 26, 1918 - May 28, 1992), the son of Greek immigrants, on the northeast corner of Beverly and Rampart boulevards west of downtown Los Angeles. The stand, which still exists today, sold hamburgers and hot dogs topped with chili. Initially, the business was slow but it soon started to pick up. During the 1960s, the entire lot at the intersection was purchased. Soon after, the northwest corner was acquired for expanded parking and storage of goods. Not long after that, a second service counter occupying the building at the perimeter of the northeast lot was set up.

Tommy's grew to 30 locations by 2006. Most Original Tommy's restaurants are found in the Greater Los Angeles Area. In recent years several locations have closed. The Santa Monica location was closed on April 20, 2014 when the landlord refused to renew the lease and leased the location to Starbucks instead.

In 2008, the company expanded for the first time outside of California by opening two locations in Clark County, Nevada. A third Nevada location was opened in 2013.

As of October 2019, there are 33 locations. The company is based in Monrovia, California, after years of being in Glendale, California, and is run by the late Mr. Koulax's family.

In mid-March 2020, in-room dining was temporarily abandoned to combat the COVID-19 pandemic.

Oldest Locations

See also 
 List of hamburger restaurants

References

External links 

1946 establishments in California
Fast-food chains of the United States
Fast-food hamburger restaurants
History of Los Angeles
Landmarks in Los Angeles
Regional restaurant chains in the United States
Restaurants established in 1946
Restaurants in Los Angeles